The Lalkuan–Amritsar Superfast Express is an Express train belonging to Northern Railway zone that runs between  and  in India. It is currently being operated with 14615/14616 train numbers on a weekly basis.

Service

The 14615/Lalkuan–Amritsar Express has an average speed of 59km/hr and covers 675 km in 16h. The 14616/Amritsar–Lalkuan Express has an average speed of 59km/hr and covers 675 km in 15h.

14615-Maximum permissible speed from Lalkuan Junction to Ambala Cantonment Junction is 130 km/h and from Ambala Cantonment Junction to Amritsar Junction its speed ranges between 110 and 120 km/h depend upon track conditions.

14616-From Amritsar Junction to Ambala Cantonment Junction Its speed ranges between 110 and 120 depends on track condition.And from Ambala Cantonment Junction to Lalkuan Junction its speed is       130 km/h.

Route and halts 

The halts of the train are:

 
 Bazpur

Coach composition

The train has standard LHB rakes with max speed of 130 kmph. The train consists of 18 coaches:

 1 AC II Tier
 3 AC III Tier
 6 Sleeper coaches
 6 General
 2 EOGs

Traction

Both trains are hauled by a Ludhiana Loco Shed-based WDP-4D EMD locomotive from Lalkuan to Amritsar and vice versa.

Direction reversal

The train reverses its direction 1 times:

Rake sharing

The train shares its rake with 12421/12422 Hazur Sahib Nanded–Amritsar Superfast Express.

See also 

 Lalkuan Junction railway station
 Amritsar Junction railway station
 Hazur Sahib Nanded–Amritsar Superfast Express

Notes

References

External links 

 14615/Lalkuan - Amritsar Express
 14616/Amritsar - Lalkuan Express

Transport in Amritsar
Express trains in India
Rail transport in Uttarakhand
Transport in Haldwani-Kathgodam
Rail transport in Haryana
Rail transport in Chandigarh
Rail transport in Punjab, India
Railway services introduced in 2015